Kabir Garba Marafa, (born 16 September 1960) is a Nigerian politician and a former senator of the Federal Republic of Nigeria who represented Zamfara Central senatorial district in the 7th and the 8th Nigerian senate (2011 to 2019), and served as the Chairman of the senate joint committee on petroleum resources. He is a member of All Progressive Congress (APC).

Early life and education 
Marafa was born to the family of Alh Garba Marafa, the district head of Yandoton daji  and a descendent of Malam Sambo Dan Ashafa  (the founder of Gusau) on 16 September 1962. Marafa attended the LEA Primary school in Yandoton daji from 1970 to 1976 and went on to government Technical school Gusau for secondary education where he obtained his GCE CERTIFICATE in  1981. He was admitted into  Kaduna polytechnic to study chemical engineering where  he graduated with a National Diploma in chemical in 1985.

Marafa also went back to obtain his HND from 1989 to 1991 at the same school and also PGD in International relations and diplomacy in 2001.

Career 
Upon completing his ND in chemical engineering, he was employed by the NNPC kaduna  and worked for some years after which he quit to venture into royal exotic furniture business and restaurants business known as the food palace.

Politics 
Marafa participated in the 2007 PDP primary elections in Zamfara state and got the ticket for the Zamfara central senatorial zone but lost to the ANPP candidate Hassan Nasiha. In 2009 when Zamfara state governor Mamuda Aliyu Shinkafi dumped ANPP for PDP, he served as commissioner for water resources and commissioner of education respectively after which he dumped the PDP when he was invited by ANPP promising to give him the senatorial ticket.

Election to the senate 

Marafa contested against the incumbent senator for Zamfara central Senator Hassan Nasiha and won in the April 2011 elections. He served as the vice chairman senate committee on petroleum downstream during the 7th senate, he was re-elected in 2015 to serve second term in the senate, he vehemently supported the election of Senator Ahmed Lawan as senate president and he became the most outspoken critic of Saraki,  he was appointed chairman senate committee on petroleum downstream by president of the senate Bukola Saraki in July 2016.

Bills and motions sponsored 

Marafa Sponsored motions on the issue of banditry and the insecurity in zamfara state in the senate where on one occasion he lamented that his zone is under siege and if the senate did not give attention to the issue he would  resigned.

He sponsored the Presidential Initiative on Zamfara (PIZAMS) bill for which the senate allocated the sum of 10 billion naira in the 2019 budget, he also co-sponsored the 2019 Petroleum Industry Bill (PIB).

Awards and honours 
Marafa was conferred with the National Honour COMMANDER OF THE ORDER OF NIGER CON in 2014 by president goodluck ebele jonathan(link) alongside  The service chiefs nad the APC chairman.

He was bestowed  the Traditional title of ‘’Marafan Gusau’’  in 2010 by the Emir of Gusau, Dr Muhammad Kabir Danbaba, OFR for being a distinguished member of the Gusau royal family.

2019 elections 

In 2018, Marafa ran for the governorship nomination of the ruling All Progressives Congress in Zamfara State but lost as a result of internal crisis in the party. The party at the time was factionalized with one faction under his control and the other was in the grip of then Governor Abdul-aziz Yari. The factions conducted parallel primaries but Independent National Electoral Commission recognised the candidates produced by Yari's faction. But Marafa had argued that the party did not conduct valid primaries and challenged the legality of the primaries purportedly conducted by Yari's faction up to the Supreme Court. On 24 May, the court ruled that the primaries conducted by Yari's faction were illegal and annulled it invalidating the election of all APC candidates in the 2019 general elections in Zamfara State. The apex court ruled that the votes received by the APC in the 2019 polls were void because it did not present candidates at the election having failed to conduct valid primaries.

References

Living people
Members of the Senate (Nigeria)
People from Zamfara State
All Nigeria Peoples Party politicians
Peoples Democratic Party (Nigeria) politicians
Kaduna Polytechnic alumni
All Progressives Congress politicians
1960 births